Anna Kournikova and Natasha Zvereva were the defending champions but did not compete that year.

Cara Black and Elena Likhovtseva won in the final 6–2, 4–6, 6–2 against Květa Hrdličková and Barbara Rittner.

Seeds
Champion seeds are indicated in bold text while text in italics indicates the round in which those seeds were eliminated.

 Cara Black /  Elena Likhovtseva (champions)
 Arantxa Sánchez-Vicario /  Magüi Serna (quarterfinals)
 Tathiana Garbin /  Janette Husárová (semifinals)
 Liezel Huber /  Laura Montalvo (first round)

Draw

References
 2001 Betty Barclay Cup Doubles Draw

2001 WTA Tour